The Palace of Bermejillo (Spanish: Palacio de Bermejillo), also known as the Palace of the Marquises of Bermejillo del Rey, is a building in Madrid, Spain, built in neo-plateresque style. It currently houses the seat of the Defender of the People (the Spanish Ombudsman).

History and description 
It is located at  31, in the Almagro neighborhood.

The project was initially commissioned to Francisco Reynals Toledo (later replaced by Frank Rank). Influenced by the neoplateresque Spanish pavilion for the 1900 International Exposition in Paris, it closely followed the project of the 16th-century Palace of Caicedo in Granada. Built between 1913 and 1916, the works were directed by Eladio Laredo and Benito Guitart.

It became the headquarters of the Spanish Ombudsman in 1983.

References 
Citations

Bibliography
 
 

Buildings and structures in Almagro neighborhood, Madrid
Palaces in Madrid